Temporary Forever is a studio album by American rapper Busdriver. It was released on Temporary Whatever in 2002. It features guest appearances from Radioinactive, Rhetoric, Of Mexican Descent, and Aceyalone. Most of the tracks were recorded and mixed by Daddy Kev, who is a co-executive producer of the album. All scratching on the album was done by D-Styles.

Critical reception

John Bush of AllMusic gave the album 4 stars out of 5, saying, "the album has so many incredible ideas and catchy riffs that it trumps entire careers by some rappers out there." He added, "Temporary Forever introduces one of the most imaginative talents to ever grace the rap world."

In 2008, Vibe included it on the "24 Lost Rap Classics" list. Sean Fennessey wrote, "his adenoidal flow, a breathless bundle of consonants and exclamation points, will challenge anyone looking to tune the MC out."

In 2015, HipHopDX included it on the "30 Best Underground Hip Hop Albums Since 2000" list.

Track listing

Personnel

Technical personnel

References

Further reading

External links
 

2002 albums
Busdriver albums
Albums produced by Daddy Kev